Denise Kandel (née Bystryn; born February 27, 1933) is an American medical sociologist and epidemiologist, Professor of Sociomedical Sciences and Psychiatry at Columbia University and Head of the Department of Epidemiology of Substance Abuse at the New York State Psychiatric Institute. She is known for her epidemiological longitudinal studies on the sequence of first-time use of various legal and illegal drugs, carried out beginning in the 1970s and continuing until at least 2016.

Life

Background and family 
Bystryn was born to Jewish parents who emigrated in the 1920s, before knowing each other, from eastern Poland to France to attend university. Her father Iser Bystryn (1901–1954) studied in Caen and became chief engineer in a truck factory near Paris. Her mother Sara Wolsky Bystryn (1906–2003) had to abandon her plans to study in Paris for financial reasons and learned making hats and corsets. Kandel was born two years after the marriage (1930) of her parents. She had a younger brother, Jean-Claude Bystryn (1938–2010), who became a known American dermatologist and scientist at the NYU Langone Medical Center. Both parents were fluent in French, but spoke Yiddish at home.

In France up to 1949 
The family lived in Colombes near Paris, and Kandel attended a primary school for girls (Ecole des Filles). The children grew up secularly, the family never went to synagogue, and had presents at Christmas. In 1941, when Kandel was eight, and one year after the German invasion of France during the Second World War, Denise’s father was arrested as a "foreign Jew" and interned 100 km south of Paris in the Nazi Beaune-la-Rolande internment camp. After some time he succeeded in fleeing to Cahors in south-western France, where could also meet his family again. While the parents – separated from each other – had to hide at changing places, the children found more stable shelter. Kandel was able to stay as a pupil in the convent Sainte-Jeanne d'Arc of Cahors until spring 1944, when she had to flee even from there and then lived with a family near Toulouse. In 1949 her family emigrated to the US.

In the USA since 1949 
Kandel attended the Lycée Français de New York, where she received the Baccalauréat after one year. At the age of 17 she was accepted by Bryn Mawr College near Philadelphia, where she graduated within two years for financial reasons. She then returned to New York to become a PhD student at Columbia University. Her tutor was Robert K. Merton, and she wrote a thesis in medical sociology about how medical students decide on their professional specialization.

During this time she met neuropsychiatrist Eric Kandel, future recipient of the 2000 Nobel Prize in Physiology or Medicine. They married in 1956 and had two children.

Scientific work 
When in the 1960s research on drug misuse gained in importance, Kandel applied to join a research team that intended to investigate drug use among high school students. She assumed she could contribute with her research experience concerning the influence of parents and peer groups on adolescents. However, she was rejected, because she wanted to interview both parents and students, and the research team feared that this might undermine students' cooperation. Kandel developed her own research project, which ultimately led to an influential longitudinal study of 1,325 persons. Later, she considered this work as a turning point in her career.

The main subject of this and further investigations was the sequence of first-time use of various legal and illegal drugs. Her research in this area found a strong resonance in scientific and political discussions, and the catchphrases "stepping-stone theory" (used since the 1930s) and "gateway hypothesis" (used since the 1980s) were associated with her name, though often misleadingly. Contrary to many others, Kandel always emphasized the difference between sequence and causation in the first-time use of different substances. These may – but need not – be coupled, a question which is investigated in further research, particularly in physiological experiments.

Awards 
 1985 – National Institutes of Health (NIH): National Institute on Drug Abuse (NIDA): Senior Scientist Research Award (K05)
 2002 – R. Brinkley Smithers Distinguished Scientist Award
 2003 – Prevention Science Award

Selected publications

Original research reports

Books 
 Denise B Kandel: The career decisions of medical students: a study in occupational recruitment and occupational choice. Dissertation, Columbia University, New York 1960.
 Denise B Kandel, Richard Hays Williams: Psychiatric rehabilitation: some problems of research. New York, Atherton 1964.
 Denise Bystryn Kandel, Gerald S. Lesser: Youth in two worlds. San Francisco, Jossey-Bass 1972, .
 Denise Bystryn Kandel: Longitudinal Research on Drug Use: Empirical Findings and Methodological Issues. Halsted Press 1978, .
 Denise B. Kandel: Parental Influences on Adolescent Marijuana Use And The Baby Boom Generation: Findings from the 1979–1996 National Household Surveys on Drug Abuse. U.S. Government Printing Office 2001, .
 Denise B. Kandel (Ed.): Stages and Pathways of Drug Involvement: Examining the Gateway Hypothesis. Cambridge University Press 2002, .

References

External links 
 Columbia University College of Physicians and Surgeons: Report on scientific collaboration of Denise & Eric Kandel, October 3, 2011  (accessed May 23, 2016).
 Video: Denise and Eric Kandel: E-Cigarettes May Promote Illicit Drug Use and Addiction, Columbia University News, September 2, 2014 (accessed May 23, 2016).

1933 births
Living people
American epidemiologists
American people of French-Jewish descent
American people of Polish-Jewish descent
American women epidemiologists
Jewish American scientists
Medical sociologists
Bryn Mawr College alumni
Columbia Graduate School of Arts and Sciences alumni
Columbia University Mailman School of Public Health faculty
21st-century American Jews
21st-century American women